Deborah Wasserman Schultz (née Wasserman; born September 27, 1966) is an American politician serving as the U.S. representative from , first elected to Congress in 2004. A member of the Democratic Party, she is a former chair of the Democratic National Committee.

Wasserman Schultz served in the Florida House of Representatives and the Florida Senate and was a national co-chair of Hillary Clinton's 2008 campaign for president. Her district covers much of southern Broward County, including a large part of Fort Lauderdale. It also covers much of northern Miami-Dade County.

Wasserman Schultz was elected chair of the Democratic National Committee in May 2011, replacing Tim Kaine. On July 28, 2016, she resigned from that position after WikiLeaks released leaked emails showing that she and other members of the DNC staff had unethically favored Hillary Clinton over Bernie Sanders in the 2016 Democratic primaries in exchange for funding to eliminate the DNC's remaining debt from the 2012 presidential campaign.

Personal life and education
Born in Forest Hills, Queens, New York, to a Jewish family, she is the daughter of Ann and Larry Wasserman. Her father is a Certified Public Accountant, and her brother Steven Wasserman is an Assistant United States Attorney for the District of Columbia.

From 1968 to 1978, the family lived in Lido Beach on Long Island. In 1978, her family moved to Melville, also on Long Island, where she graduated from Half Hollow Hills High School East in 1984. She received a Bachelor of Arts in 1988 and a Master of Arts with a certificate in political campaigning in 1990, both in political science, from the University of Florida.

At the University of Florida, Wasserman Schultz was active in student government, serving as president of the Student Senate and the founder and president of the Rawlings Area Council Government. She was also a member of the Omicron Delta Kappa honor society, the James C. Grimm chapter of the National Residence Hall Honorary, and the union Graduate Assistants United. She served as president of the Graduate Student Council and vice president of the UF College Democrats. She has credited her experience in student politics with developing her "love for politics and the political process."

Wasserman Schultz lives in Weston, near Fort Lauderdale. She is married to Steve Schultz; they have three children. She is an active member of the National Jewish Democratic Council, Planned Parenthood, and Hadassah.

In March 2009, she revealed that she had undergone seven surgeries related to breast cancer in 2008 while maintaining her responsibilities as a member of the House. That year, she promoted efforts for early screening for breast cancer.

Career

Florida state legislature

In 1988, Wasserman Schultz became an aide to Peter Deutsch at the beginning of his state legislative career. In 1992, Deutsch successfully ran for United States Representative of Florida's 20th congressional district, and suggested to Wasserman Schultz that she run for his vacated seat in the Florida House of Representatives. Wasserman Schultz won 53% of the vote in a six-way Democratic primary, avoiding a runoff, and won the general election. At 26, she became the youngest female legislator in the state's history.

She served four terms in the Florida State House of Representatives, for eight years, leaving due to state term limits. She became an adjunct instructor of political science at Broward Community College, as well as a public policy curriculum specialist at Nova Southeastern University.

Wasserman Schultz was elected to the Florida State Senate in 2000. She supported several bills, including the Florida Residential Swimming Pool Safety Act and one creating a Children's Services Council for Broward County. She received an award from the Save The Manatee Club for her commitment as a state senator in the 2002 legislative session to manatee protection.

U.S. House of Representatives

Committee assignments
 United States House Committee on Appropriations
United States House Appropriations Subcommittee on Military Construction, Veterans Affairs, and Related Agencies (Chairwoman)
 United States House Appropriations Subcommittee on Energy and Water Development
United States House Committee on Oversight and Reform
United States House Oversight Subcommittee on Civil Rights and Civil Liberties
United States House Oversight Subcommittee on National Security

Caucus memberships 

 Congressional Solar Caucus
 New Democrat Coalition
 Congressional Arts Caucus
 Afterschool Caucus
 United States Congressional International Conservation Caucus

Party leadership
 Chief Deputy Whip

Wasserman Schultz was appointed to the Democratic Steering and Policy Committee in her first term. During the 2006 elections, she raised over $17 million in campaign contributions for her Democratic colleagues (third-most after Nancy Pelosi and Rahm Emanuel), was chosen as Chief Deputy Whip, and was appointed to the Appropriations Committee, a plum assignment for a sophomore representative.

Wasserman Schultz chairs the committee's Subcommittee on Military Construction, Veterans Affairs, and Related Agencies. Shortly after joining the Appropriations Committee, she received a waiver necessary to sit on an additional committee (Appropriations is typically an exclusive committee), and she is now a member of the Committee on Oversight and Reform. Aside from her committee and leadership roles, she was a member of Nancy Pelosi's "30 Something" Working Group, which consists of congressional Democrats mostly under age 40. The group concentrates on issues affecting young people, including Social Security. She joined the bipartisan Congressional Cuba Democracy Caucus. According to the Congress.org 2008 Power Rankings, she was the 24th-most powerful member of the House, the 22nd-most powerful Democratic representative, and the most powerful Florida representative.

Political positions
Wasserman Schultz supports gun control legislation and the LGBT community. She initiated the 2007 Virginia Graeme Baker Pool and Spa Safety Act. In 2011, Wasserman Schultz was one of the 23 co-sponsors of H.R. 3261, the Stop Online Piracy Act (SOPA).

On April 25, 2018, 57 members of the House of Representatives, including Wasserman Schultz, released a condemnation of Holocaust distortion in Ukraine and Poland. They criticized Poland's new Holocaust law, which would criminalize accusing Poles of complicity in the Holocaust, and Ukraine's 2015 memory laws glorifying Ukrainian Insurgent Army (UPA) and its pro-Nazi leaders, such as Roman Shukhevych.

In December 2019, Wasserman Schultz voted to impeach President Donald Trump.

Consumer Finance Protection Bureau and payday lending
In December 2015, Wasserman Schultz was one of 24 co-sponsors of H.R. 4018, authored by Representative Dennis A. Ross, which would delay the implementation of CFPB regulations. She was among a dozen Florida representatives who cosponsored the legislation that would delay the CFPB's payday lending rules by two years and void a "deferred presentment transaction" in states with laws similar to Florida's. She has drawn criticism for trying to delay those regulations.

Terri Schiavo case

The Terri Schiavo case concerned the fate of a young Florida woman who had suffered brain damage after a heart attack in 1990 and was in a coma on life support. Her husband, who was her legal guardian while engaged to another woman, and the medical team wanted to remove her feeding tube, as she was in a "persistent vegetative state" with no hope of improvement. Her parents opposed this decision for years, appealing to courts, Congress, and ultimately to President George W. Bush to intervene. Wasserman Schultz was one of the strongest opponents of congressional intervention in what she believed should be a private family decision. The feeding tube was removed in 2005, resulting in Schiavo's death.

Wasserman Schultz publicly accused Bush of hypocrisy for having signed a 1999 bill as governor of Texas that allows health care workers to remove life support for terminally ill patients if the patient or family is unable to pay the medical bills. During the debate, she pointed out that a Texas law Bush signed allowed caregivers to withhold treatment "at the point that futility has been reached and there is no longer any hope of survival or of additional health care measures being used to sustain life. ... [this] seems to conflict with his position today." Cox News Service reported, "The Texas law was intended to control in cases in which medical teams and patients' representatives disagree on treatment. In the Schiavo case, the medical team and Schiavo's husband agreed that there was no hope of improvement in her condition, determined by lower courts to be a 'persistent vegetative state'." Wasserman Schultz also cited the case of a six-month-old Texas baby whose life support had been removed.

Israeli–Palestinian conflict
While her predecessor and mentor Peter Deutsch was "among the most hawkish congressional Democrats on Middle East issues", Wasserman Schultz, who took over his seat for Florida's 20th district, "a heavily Jewish swath of Broward County", has taken a more centrist approach. In 2005 she spoke in approval of President Bush's proposals to give financial aid to the Palestinian Authority in both the proposed supplemental and in the 2006 budgets. She said:

We want to continue to focus on making sure that ... the policy coming from Washington continues to encourage and support and nurture the peace process. In [Bush's] first four years, there was a lack of leadership coming from the administration. I know many people in the Jewish community were happy with the president's position on Israel, but the way I thought, there was an absence of leadership. ... So I'm glad to see there's a little more engagement and involvement from the administration.

Wasserman Schultz is a supporter of Israel. She defended her party against suggestions that the Democrats are anti-Israel, saying:

I would stack up the Democratic caucus's position on the support for Israel against the Republican caucus's any day of the week and be much more confident—and the Jewish community should be much more confident—in the Democrats' stewardship of Israel than the Republicans, especially if you compare the underlying reasons for both groups' support for Israel. The very far-right group of Republicans' interest in Israel is not because they are so supportive of there being a Jewish state and making sure that Jews have a place that we can call home. It has references to Armageddon and biblical references that are more their interest. So I would encourage members of the Jewish community to put their faith in Democrats, because our support for Israel is generally for the right reasons.

Wasserman Schultz supported Israel in the 2014 Israel–Gaza conflict and criticized MSNBC's coverage of it, saying: "Clearly [MSNBC was] highlighting what Israel had done to Gaza and the plight of Palestinians. My first thought was, where is the balance? Where is the spotlight on what Jewish children in Israel go through from being victims of rocket attacks?"

Wasserman Schultz supported President Trump's decision to recognize Jerusalem as Israel's capital, saying: "We must work toward a day where the entire world recognizes Jerusalem as the capital of Israel, and that can be achieved through final status negotiations. I remain as committed as ever to safeguarding Israel's future as a Jewish and democratic state, at peace with its neighbors, with Jerusalem as its undisputed capital."

Presidential signing statements
Wasserman Schultz supports the use of appropriations for future control of presidential signing statements as revealed during questions in a July 26, 2008, House Judiciary Committee hearing on the constitutional limits of executive power.

Jewish American Heritage Month

Wasserman Schultz is Florida's first female Jewish member of Congress.

In 2022, Wasserman Schultz convened a congressional hearing to investigate allegations that big tech media companies were not holding instances of antisemitism on their respective platforms.

She and Senator Arlen Specter were the driving forces behind the resolution that declared May Jewish American Heritage Month. The annual observance was created to recognize "the accomplishments of American Jews and the important role that members of the Jewish community have played in the development of American culture". The observance is modeled after Black History Month, Hispanic Heritage Month and Women's History Month. Wasserman Schultz envisioned "classroom instruction, public ceremonies and broadcast announcements", saying, "There's a generation of children growing up with a fading memory of what happened during World War II or even an understanding of anyone who is Jewish or their culture and traditions. Through education comes tolerance." The bill introducing the observance passed unanimously in both the House and the Senate and was signed by President George W. Bush. Wasserman Schultz said of the proclamation, "This is an historic occasion. Generations to come will have the chance to live without antisemitism through greater understanding and awareness of the significant role that American Jews have played in U.S. history. Jewish American Heritage Month is a reality because of the people gathered today in this room."

The measure was criticized by Gary Cass, executive director of the now-defunct Center for Reclaiming America for Christ, a conservative Christian organization based in Fort Lauderdale, who objected to "teaching Jewish history without talk of religious practices and values", saying, "We cannot seem to have an honest discussion about the Christian roots of America". He added, "How much tolerance would [Wasserman Schultz] have for a Christian Heritage month?" She replied that the situation is different, that "Judaism is unique, because it is both a culture and a religion", and that she was not in favor of "teaching any religion in public schools". Her father, Larry Wasserman, said that while she had not been particularly active in the Jewish community before entering politics, she has "forged ties with Jewish groups as a lawmaker. She helped to form the National Jewish Democratic Council and served on the regional board of the American Jewish Congress."

2008 financial crisis
On September 29, 2008, Wasserman Schultz voted for the Emergency Economic Stabilization Act of 2008, and on October 3, 2008, for the revised version of that act.

Hate crimes
During an April 2009 House Judiciary Committee hearing on the Hate Crimes Prevention Act of 2009, Representative Tom Rooney, a former active duty U.S. Army JAG Corps officer, introduced an amendment that would make attacks against military veterans a hate crime. Wasserman Schultz remarked on the amendment:

Death of Daniel Wultz

Wasserman Schultz became a vocal advocate for the family of Daniel Wultz, constituents of hers who were engaged in legal action against the Bank of China. They alleged it had a role in financing the terrorist attack that killed the 16-year-old from Weston, Florida, in 2006.

In August 2013, Wasserman Schultz told the Miami Herald: "In South Florida, we all know too well of the tragic circumstances surrounding the cowardly terrorist attack that took Daniel Wultz's innocent life. I have been working hand in hand with the Wultz family and the state of Israel to ensure any and all of those involved in this terrorist activity, including the Bank of China, pay for their crimes so that justice can be served."

On May 1, 2014, together with then-House Majority Leader Eric Cantor, Wasserman Schultz hosted the Wultz family at the U.S. Capitol in a National Prayer Day event.

Identity theft
On February 15, 2013, Wasserman Schultz introduced the Stopping Tax Offenders and Prosecuting Identity Theft Act of 2013 (H.R. 744; 113th Congress) into the House. The bill would increase the penalties on identity thieves and change the definition of identity theft to include businesses and organizations instead of just individuals.

Marijuana
Wasserman Schultz opposed a 2014 medical marijuana amendment in Florida that narrowly failed to receive the 60% of votes needed to amend the Constitution of Florida. She angered medical marijuana activists and major Democratic donors over this and her comparisons of medical marijuana dispensaries to "pill mills", which overprescribe and overdispense painkillers to patients with dubious symptoms. After Wasserman Schultz expressed interest in running for the United States Senate in 2016, medical marijuana activists vowed to thwart her ambition. Attorney and donor John Morgan said that her position on medical marijuana "disqualifies her from the [Democratic Senate] nomination... Her position denies terminally ill and chronically ill people compassion."

In response, in February 2015, Wasserman Schultz's staff emailed Morgan, offering to change her position on medical marijuana if Morgan would stop criticizing her. Morgan declined her offer and released the emails to Politico, calling her a "bully". Wasserman Schultz at first declined to comment, then denied that her office had sent the emails. Morgan responded: "What Debbie leaves out in her pushback was the crystal clear message that her potential support of the new amendment [that has been proposed for the ballot in 2016] was predicated upon me withdrawing my comments to Politico. I don't know how to view that as anything but an offer of a quid pro quo."

Gun control
In 2018, Wasserman Schultz co-sponsored a bill to "strengthen school safety and security", which required a two-thirds vote for passage, given it was brought up under an expedited process. The House voted 407–10 to approve the bill, which would "provide $50 million a year for a new federal grant program to train students, teachers and law enforcement on how to spot and report signs of gun violence". Named the STOP (Students, Teachers, and Officers Preventing) School Violence Act, it would "develop anonymous telephone and online systems where people could report threats of violence." At the same time, it would authorize $25 million for schools to improve and harden their security, such as installing new locks, lights, metal detectors and panic buttons." A separate spending bill would be required to provide money for the grant program.

Political campaigns

2004 
In 2004, Wasserman Schultz's mentor Peter Deutsch resigned his Congressional seat to make an unsuccessful run for the Senate seat of fellow Democrat Bob Graham. Wasserman Schultz was unopposed in the Democratic primary election held to fill Deutsch's seat. Her Republican opponent was Margaret Hostetter, a realtor who had never held public office. The 20th is so heavily Democratic that Hostetter faced nearly impossible odds in November, but she gained notoriety for her attacks on Wasserman Schultz. For example, Hostetter's campaign site criticized Wasserman Schultz for protesting an American flag photograph with a Christian cross on it that was on display in the workstation of a secretary in a government building. Hostetter wrote, "Elect Margaret Hostetter to Congress November 2 and send the clear message that Americans respect and support... the foundational role Christianity has had in the formation of our great nation. Our rights come from God, not the state."

Wasserman Schultz won with 70.2% of the vote to Hostetter's 29.8%. When she was sworn in on January 4, 2005, she chose to use the Hebrew Bible, or Tanakh. Because Speaker of the House Dennis Hastert only had a Christian bible, his staff borrowed a copy of the Tanakh from Representative Gary Ackerman for this purpose. (This was brought up two years later during the Qur'an oath controversy of the 110th United States Congress.)

2006 

Wasserman Schultz was unopposed for reelection in 2006.

2008 

In 2008 Wasserman Schultz defeated Independent Margaret Hostetter and Socialist write-in candidate Marc Luzietti.

She supported Hillary Clinton for her party's 2008 presidential nomination, and in June 2007 was named one of Clinton's national campaign co-chairs. Once Senator Barack Obama became the presumptive Democratic nominee, she endorsed him and joined Senator Ken Salazar and Representative Artur Davis to second his nomination at the 2008 Democratic National Convention.

On CBS's Face the Nation, she called Sarah Palin unready for the Vice Presidency. "She knows nothing...Quite honestly, the interview I saw and that Americans saw on Thursday and Friday was similar to when I didn't read a book in high school and had to read the CliffsNotes and phone in my report", Wasserman Schultz said of Palin's interview with ABC's Charlie Gibson the previous week. "She's Cliff-noted her performance so far." Wasserman Schultz was also named a co-chair of the Democratic Party's Red to Blue congressional campaign group. Controversy arose in March 2008 when she felt unable to campaign against South Florida Republican representatives Ileana Ros-Lehtinen, Mario Díaz-Balart, and the now-retired Lincoln Díaz-Balart because of her good friendship with them. Wasserman Schultz and Ros-Lehtinen are both on the LGBT Equality Caucus of which Wasserman Schultz was a vice chair. Ros-Lehtinen has been the sole Republican on the 112-member caucus since 2013.

2010 

Wasserman Schultz defeated Republican nominee Karen Harrington, Independents Stanley Blumenthal and Bob Kunst, and Florida Whig Party candidate Clayton Schock with 60.1% of the vote.

2012 

After the 2010 census, Wasserman Schultz's district was renumbered the 23rd and pushed further into Miami-Dade County, taking in most of Miami Beach and a portion of Miami itself. Harrington ran again. Wasserman Schultz won with 63.2% of the vote to Harrington's 35.6%. When she was sworn in, she became the first white Democrat to represent a significant portion of Miami since 1993.

2014 

In the general election, Wasserman Schultz defeated Republican Joe Kaufman, 62.7% to 37.3%.

2016 

After a court-ordered redistricting in 2015, Wasserman Schultz lost much of her share of Miami-Dade County, including her portions of Miami and Miami Beach.

Economist and law professor Tim Canova challenged Wasserman Schultz in the August 30, 2016, Democratic primary. He was endorsed by Senator Bernie Sanders. Wasserman Schultz won the primary with 57% of the vote.

On August 8, 2016, in the wake of the WikiLeaks Democratic National Committee email disclosures, Canova filed a Federal Election Commission (FEC) violations of regulations complaint against Wasserman Schultz, alleging "interference" with his campaign, contending that on her behalf "the DNC paid a team of national, senior communications and political professionals significant sums of money for their consulting services and the Wasserman Schultz for Congress Campaign utilized these services free of charge." A spokesman for Wasserman Schultz said that the complaint was without merit and that it was "based on stolen, cherry-picked information".

In the general election, Wasserman Schultz defeated Republican nominee Joe Kaufman with 56.7% of the vote.

2018 

Wasserman Schultz ran unopposed in the Democratic primary and was challenged by Kaufman and Independent candidates Tim Canova and Don Endriss. She won the general election with 58.48% of the vote.

2020 

Wasserman Schultz was challenged by Florida attorney Jen Perelman in the August 2020 Democratic primary.

On August 16, 2020, Martina Velasquez, a 16-year-old volunteer for Perelman's campaign, filed a police report alleging that Wasserman Schultz had shoved her more than once when both were talking to voters. Velasquez declined to press charges but asked for a public apology. In the August 18 primary Perelman won 28% of the vote to Wasserman Schultz's 72%.

Chair of the Democratic National Committee
 
On April 5, 2011, President Barack Obama chose Wasserman Schultz to succeed Tim Kaine as the 52nd chair of the Democratic National Committee. Until she assumed office, Donna Brazile served as interim DNC chair. Wasserman Schultz was confirmed at a May 4 DNC meeting in Washington, D.C.

During an appearance on Face the Nation, Wasserman Schultz said, "The Republicans have a plan to end Medicare as we know it. What they would do is they would take the people who are younger than 55 years old today and tell them, 'You know what? You're on your own. Go and find private health insurance in the health-care insurance market.'" Four nonpartisan fact-checkers called her claim false. She then came under criticism for saying on Washington Watch with Roland Martin, "You have the Republicans, who want to literally drag us all the way back to Jim Crow laws and literally—and very transparently—block access to the polls to voters who are more likely to vote for Democratic candidates than Republican candidates". The next day, she said that "Jim Crow was the wrong analogy to use".

In 2012, many of Obama's advisers questioned the move to select Wasserman Schultz as DNC chair, feeling she came across as too partisan on television. An internal focus study of the popularity of top Obama campaign surrogates ranked Wasserman Schultz at the bottom. In February 2015, Politico, citing unnamed sources, reported that Wasserman Schultz had lined up supporters in 2013 to portray any decision by Obama to replace her as DNC chair as "anti-woman and anti-Semitic".

In 2011, she missed 62 votes of Congress, placing her 45th of 535 in missing Congressional votes.

2016 presidential election

Clinton's opponents Martin O'Malley and Bernie Sanders both criticized Wasserman Schultz's decision to schedule only six debates in the 2016 presidential primary, fewer than in previous election cycles, as well as the timing of the debates.

Ultimately, there were nine debates that both Clinton and Sanders participated in during the primaries, as well as a number of town halls.

Some of Wasserman Schultz's actions that the news covered during the primaries were reducing the debate schedule; uninviting former DNC Vice Chair Tulsi Gabbard to the first primary debate; halting the Sanders campaign's access to DNC databases after a staffer from his campaign attempted to exploit a security breach; defending the superdelegate system used in the Democratic primaries; rescinding a prior ban on corporate donations; and accusing Sanders supporters of violence at the Nevada Convention.

Resignation/controversies

After WikiLeaks published DNC emails that showed that some DNC staffers had actively supported Clinton against Sanders in the primary, Wasserman Schultz tendered her resignation as head of the DNC, to become effective as of the close of the nominating convention in Philadelphia. According to reports in The Washington Post, Wasserman Schultz strongly resisted suggestions she resign until a phone call from Obama persuaded her.

After a speech at the convention before the Florida delegation during which Wasserman Schultz was "booed off stage" by Sanders supporters, the DNC decided that she would not open the convention.

2017 House IT staff accused

In February 2017 Politico and BuzzFeed reported Capitol Police accused five IT staffers (who worked for more than 30 House Democrats including Wasserman Schultz) of trying to steal House computer equipment and violating House security policies.

As of February 6, 2017, Politico noted that Wasserman Schultz was one of several House members who did not terminate the suspected staffers after the criminal complaints. In July 2017, one of the accused staffers, Imran Awan, was arrested for making a false statement on a bank loan application. After his arrest, Wasserman Schultz's office fired Awan. Wasserman Schultz later defended her decision not to fire Awan earlier, saying, "I believe that I did the right thing, and I would do it again."

In 2018, The Washington Post reported:
Federal prosecutors concluded an 18-month investigation into a former congressional technology staffer on Tuesday by publicly debunking allegations — promoted by conservative media and President Trump — suggesting he was a Pakistani operative who stole government secrets with cover from House Democrats. As part of an agreement with prosecutors, Imran Awan pleaded guilty to a relatively minor offense unrelated to his work on Capitol Hill: making a false statement on a bank loan application. U.S. prosecutors said they would not recommend jail time.

According to The New York Times:In the plea agreement, federal prosecutors debunked conspiracy theories about the case that had circulated online. They said that the government had interviewed about 40 witnesses, examined the House Democratic Caucus server and other data and devices, reviewed electronic communications and interviewed Mr. Awan on numerous occasions. They found no evidence that Mr. Awan had engaged in illegal conduct involving House computer systems.

October 2018 mail bomb attempt

On October 24, 2018, a pipe bomb device sent to former U.S. Attorney General Eric Holder, which had the wrong address, was instead delivered to the Florida office of Wasserman Schultz, whose name and address was on the return labels of all the packages. During this time, similar pipe bomb devices had been sent to various influential Democratic politicians. The packages containing the devices, as well as envelopes containing mysterious white powder, also labeled Schultz's office in Sunrise, Florida, as the sender, but the person who sent these devices and envelopes misspelled her name as "Shultz." The same day, a similar device was found at Wasserman Schultz's office in Aventura, Florida, as well. Fingerprint DNA helped identify the suspect as Florida resident and right-wing conspiracist Cesar Sayoc, who, was arrested in a parking lot in Plantation, Florida, on October 26, 2018.

Electoral history

Florida House of Representatives

Florida Senate

U.S. House of Representatives

Awards
 Crime Fighter of the Year Award, Rape Abuse and Incest National Network (RAINN), 2008
 Giraffe Award, Women's Advocacy Majority Minority (WAMM), 1993
 Outstanding Family Advocacy award, Dade County Psychol. Assn., 1993
 Rosemary Barkett award, Academy of Florida Trial Lawyers, 1995
 Woman of the Year, AMIT, 1994
 Outstanding Legislator of the year, Florida Federation of Business & Professional Women, 1994
 Quality Floridian, Florida League of Cities, 1994
 Woman of Vision, Weizmann Institute of Science
 One of Six Most Unstoppable Women, South Florida Magazine, 1994.

See also
 List of Jewish members of the United States Congress
 Women in the United States House of Representatives

References

External links

 Congresswoman Debbie Wasserman Schultz official U.S. House website
 Debbie Wasserman Schultz for Congress
 

 

1966 births
20th-century American politicians
20th-century American women politicians
21st-century American politicians
21st-century American women politicians
Democratic National Committee chairs
Female members of the United States House of Representatives
Democratic Party Florida state senators
Jewish members of the United States House of Representatives
Jewish women politicians
Democratic Party members of the United States House of Representatives from Florida
Living people
Democratic Party members of the Florida House of Representatives
People from Forest Hills, Queens
People from Lido Beach, New York
People from Weston, Florida
University of Florida College of Liberal Arts and Sciences alumni
Women state legislators in Florida
Jewish American state legislators in Florida
21st-century American Jews
American Jews from Florida